The Food and Drugs Act (the Act) (formal title An Act respecting food, drugs, cosmetics and therapeutic devices) is an act of the Parliament of Canada regarding the production, import, export, transport across provinces and sale of food, drugs, contraceptive devices and cosmetics (including personal cleaning products such as soap and toothpaste). It was first passed in 1920 and most recently revised in 1985. It attempts to ensure that these products are safe, that their ingredients are disclosed and that drugs are effective and are not sold as food or cosmetics. It also states that cures for disease listed in Schedule A (including cancer, obesity, anxiety, asthma, depression, appendicitis, and sexually transmitted diseases), cannot be advertised to the general public.

Background
After the launch of the Federal Department of Health in 1919, the Food and Drugs Act was presented in late 1920. Rules and regulations developed under the Act established the requirements for licensing and creating drugs in Canada. The law granted the Minister of Health the right to cancel or suspend licenses of companies failing to comply with the requirements.

The Food and Drugs Act was not significantly modified until 1947 when the foundations were laid for the current market today. In 1951, drug manufacturers were required to submit a file for each new drug prior to marketing their product. However, during the early 1960s, the drug thalidomide, which had been approved to enter the market, resulted in the deaths of thousands of infants and severe birth defects in others when the drug was taken by women in early stages of pregnancy.

As a result of the problems caused by the drug thalidomide, the Act was revisited and strengthened by Health Canada. The revised version placed new requirements on manufacturers to provide evidence for efficacy in seeking a Notice of Compliance, which must be obtained before any drug could be sold. The manufacturer must meet all the requirements before making any drug available to the public, but once the drug passes with no adverse reactions and without any changes needed to the drug's formula, it may never be subjected to review by Health Canada again. Some health advocates want post-approval surveillance to watch for unexpected problems.

Part I
Part I provides general interpretations of the terms, and provides details of each of the topics discussed on what the Act entails:
Food
Drugs
Cosmetics
Devices

Part II
Part II of the Act focuses the administration and the Enforcement that allows the government to intervene with the manufacturer.
It entails:
Inspection, Seizure and forfeiture
Analysis
Power of the Minister
Incorporation by Reference
Regulations
Interim Orders
Marketing Authorization
Offense and Punishment
Exports

Parts III and IV
Parts III (enacted in 1961) and IV (enacted in 1969) provided for implementation of controls required by the Convention on Psychotropic Substances. Part III dealt with "controlled" drugs such as amphetamine, methaqualone, and phenmetrazine, which have legitimate medical uses. Part IV focused on Schedule H "restricted drugs", those whose only legitimate use is for scientific research, such as the hallucinogens LSD, DMT, and MDMA. These parts established eight classes of regulated substances, ranging from Schedules A to H.

The 1996 Controlled Drugs and Substances Act repealed Parts III and IV.

2008 proposed amendment 

In April 2008, an amendment to the Food and Drugs Act, Canadian Bill C-51 was tabled in the House of Commons. The purpose of this bill was to modernize the regulatory system for foods and therapeutic products, to strengthen the oversight of the benefits and risks of therapeutic products throughout their life cycle, to support effective compliance and enforcement actions and to enable a greater transparency and openness of the regulatory system.  Some of the proposed amendments are as follows:

Illegalize the sale and importation of products that have knowingly been adulterated.
Illegalize the sale of counterfeit therapeutic products.
Clarify in the Food and Drugs Act the requirement of therapeutic products to have market authorization, which has been required by Health Canada for many years.

The bill has been subject to criticism due to a perception that the bill would illegalize all food and Natural Health Products by categorizing them as drug products. Natural health products in Canada have been regulated as a subset of drugs since the Natural Health Products Regulations were put into place on January 1, 2004. Health Canada has stated "The Natural Health Product Regulations, introduced in 2004, will continue to operate the same way under Bill C-51. Canadians will continue to have access to natural health products that are safe, effective and of high quality.

In spite of this claim, The Natural Health Industry remained skeptical.  A watchdog group was employed to investigate the concerns and a number of hidden camera videos surfaced that further aggravated the NHP industry concerns.

See also
 Therapeutic Products Directorate
 Food safety
 Medical device
 Food Bill 160-2 of New Zealand
 Food Safety Modernization Act
 Pledge to Africa Act

References

External links
Food and Drugs Act Justice Canada
Canada's Previous Drug Laws (before the Controlled Drugs and Substances Act came into force in May 1997), Canadian Foundation for Drug Policy.
Cannabis Canada Issue 7.
Co-operation between Canada and other countries and territories to promote countermeasures against illicit drug trafficking, 1987.
Debates of the House of Commons of Canada, Oct. 30, 1995.
Official Government of Canada webpage for information on Bill C-51
Complete transcript of C51
Bill C-51 and the Regulation of Natural Health Products – Fast Facts
Brief History of Drug Regulation in Canada

Canadian federal legislation
1920 in Canadian law
Food law
Food and drink in Canada
Drug control law in Canada